Glen Templeton is an American country singer and songwriter.

Career
Templeton released his debut single "I Could Be the One", written by Jay Knowles and Thom McHugh, on April 19, 2011. "I Could Be the One" was originally recorded by Billy Ray Cyrus on his 2009 album Back to Tennessee. In July 2011, Glen was signed to Black River Entertainment. Templeton also released a self-titled extended play on June 6, 2011, which included the single as well as three additional songs. "I Could Be the One" debuted at number 58 on the U.S. Billboard Hot Country Songs chart for the week ending July 30, 2011, and ultimately reached a peak of number 53. Two more singles followed: "Sing That Song Again" and "Ball Cap." "Sing That Song Again" peaked at number 60 on the Hot Country Songs chart, while "Ball Cap" (written by Cassidy Lynn Alexander, Forest Whitehead, and Dylan Scott) was released to SiriusXM Satellite Radio. In early 2015, Templeton and his label, Black River Entertainment, parted ways.

Discography

Extended plays

Singles

Music videos

References

American country singer-songwriters
American male singer-songwriters
People from Tuscaloosa, Alabama
Black River Entertainment artists
Living people
Country musicians from Alabama
Year of birth missing (living people)
Singer-songwriters from Alabama